Andrew Mark Atherton (born 1975) is a male former British gymnast.

Gymnastics career
Atherton represented England and won a gold medal in the team event and two silver medals in the rings and all-around events, at the 1998 Commonwealth Games in Kuala Lumpur, Malaysia.

References

1975 births
Living people
British male artistic gymnasts
Gymnasts at the 1998 Commonwealth Games
Commonwealth Games gold medallists for England
Commonwealth Games silver medallists for England
Commonwealth Games medallists in gymnastics
Medallists at the 1998 Commonwealth Games